Cydia piperana, the ponderosa pine seedworm moth, is a moth of the family Tortricidae. It is found in southwestern North America.

The wingspan is about 19 mm.

The larvae feed on the seeds of Pinus ponderosa and Pinus jefferyi.

External links
 Photo of adult

Grapholitini